Calathea paucifolia is a species of plant in the Marantaceae family. It is endemic to Ecuador.  Its natural habitat is subtropical or tropical moist lowland forests.

References

paucifolia
Endemic flora of Ecuador
Near threatened plants
Taxonomy articles created by Polbot